Vovousa (or ) is a village and a former community in the Ioannina regional unit, Epirus, Greece. Since the 2011 local government reform it is part of the municipality Zagori, of which it is a municipal unit. The municipal unit has an area of 51.029 km2. It is one of the original Zagori villages. Population 115 (2011). Vovousa is a traditional Aromanian settlement.

Geography
Vovousa is located on the river Vjosa and is one of the easternmost villages of Zagori. It is also located near the National Park of Valia Kalda. The single-arched stone bridge of Misios was built in 1748 with a donation by Alexis Mitsios from Vitsa.

History
Vovousa was considered among the largest villages in Zagori. Most of its inhabitants moved in the 19th century to the vicinity of Serres in Macedonia. The village was burnt by the Germans on 23 October 1943.

References

External links
 Live Weather Station – Weather Forecast

Populated places in Ioannina (regional unit)
Zagori
Aromanian settlements in Greece